Cain and Abel (Filipino: Cain at Abel) is a 1982 Philippine action thriller drama film directed by Lino Brocka from a written story and screenplay by Ricardo "Ricky" Lee. The film's story was inspired by the Biblical story of two brothers, Christopher de Leon and Phillip Salvador respectively played the roles of Ellis and Lorenzo, the two brothers and sons of Senyora Pina (Mona Lisa), who have different views on each other. However, the sibling rivalry became violent and bloody due to the issue of inheritance of their family land and Senyora Pina's favoritism to her younger son. It also stars Carmi Martin as Zita, Ellis's fiancée from Manila; Cecille Castillo as Rina, the house helper, and Ellis's other woman; and Baby Delgado as Becky, Lorenzo's wife.

Cain at Abel was released on October 8, 1982, by Cine Suerte Inc., it served as the first Filipino film entry for the San Sebastián International Film Festival in Spain in the same year, and received accolades from award-giving bodies for cinema. The film was digitally restored and remastered by ABS-CBN Film Restoration Project and Central Digital Lab in 2016; the restored version was premiered on August 11, 2016.

Plot
Lorenzo, the eldest son of Donya Pina, returns home tipsy from a drinking party in the countryside and starts asking his mother about the idea of buying tractors for the farm. However, his mother refuses, citing that the farmers of the plantation would slack off. The conversation between Lorens and his mother turned into an argument after the former gave a threat to her. On the following day, Ellis, the youngest son, returns home from his studies in Manila and brought his classmate Zita, who will spend her vacation at the household. Later, while Ellis entertains his family, Lorens returned and sees his brother suspiciously due to his envy towards him and his mother's favoritism toward Ellis.

At dinnertime, Ellis began to notice why his room was used and Lorens replied that he used it for his sons. The questioning caused a small argument between the two brothers but their mother stopped it. A few hours later, Lorens went to the nightclub and they conversed with his friends, talking about his brother Ellis and Senyora Pina. While Senyora Pina mentioned her planned will and testament, Ellis wants the land to be his, and according to the matriarch, Lorens brought problems to the family, citing his mismanagement of the family plantation. As they continue talking, Ellis told to his mother that he decided to drop out of college and wanted to marry Zita. Senyora Pina, however, agreed with Ellis's requests, despite the criticism about Zita.

Cast

 Christopher de Leon as Ellis Laurente
 Phillip Salvador as Lorenzo "Lorens" Laurente
 Mona Lisa as Senyora Pina Laurente
 Carmi Martin as Zita
 Cecille Castillo as Rina
 Baby Delgado as Becky
 Ruel Vernal as Jumbo
 Michael Zandico as Robert
 Venchito Galvez as Pilo
 Tonio Gutierrez as Robert's Group #1
 Bey Vito as Robert's Group #2
 Joseph Jardinazo as Tikboy
 Fred Capulong
 Jumbo Salvador as Lolit
 Greg Sta. Ines as Celso
 Naty Mallares as Lola Upe
 Dante Balois as Dante
 Jonathan Romulo
 Roger Moring
 Eddie Ortega	
 SOS Daredevils
 Ryan Soler as Jimboy
 James Acuesta as Alvaro
 Baby Shanny as Baby
 Grace Torres

Production credits

Casting
According to now-former actor Ryan Soler in an exclusive interview from Philippine Entertainment Portal, the film Cain at Abel served as his first foray into the show business field, before landing roles in TV programs like Anna Liza and Lovingly Yours, Helen.

Release

Theatrical
The film was released in the Philippines on October 8, 1982, by Cine Suerte Inc.

Overseas releases
Cain at Abel was part of the official film entries for the 1982 San Sebastian International Film Festival, premiered on September 18, 1982. It was also screened in Japan on March 15, 1997, as one of the Filipino films exhibited by The Japan Foundation in Tokyo and February 6, 1998, as part of the Lino Brocka retrospective exhibition in Fukuoka.

Restoration
The restoration of Cain at Abel was made possible by the joint cooperation of ABS-CBN Film Restoration Project and Philippine post-production company Central Digital Lab. Prior to the restoration project's transition to digital scans of the films held at the ABS-CBN Film Archives in 4K resolution, starting with Cain at Abel, the films were scanned digitally in high definition (HD). Also, this film is the very first Lino Brocka to be restored and remastered by the network's restoration project.

The restoration team of ABS-CBN used the 35mm negative film print of the film that was held in their archives as the source element for the digital restoration. However, due to censorship reasons, the scenes depicting Cita's rape and eventual death were removed from the negative. The 35mm negative was digitally scanned first in 4K resolution before going to digital restoration in 2K resolution. The digital restoration of Cain at Abel was completed in 2016.

The restored version of Cain at Abel was premiered on August 11, 2016, at the Tanghalang Aurelio Tolentino in the Cultural Center of the Philippines as part of the Digital Classics section for the Cinemalaya Philippine International Film Festival. The premiere was attended by the film's writer Ricky Lee; stars Phillip Salvador, Cecille Castillo, and Carmi Martin; Danilo Brocka, the director's brother; and Evangeline Bocobo and Celine Beatrice Fabie, Mona Lisa's respective daughter and granddaughter.

Home media
The film was released by Kani Releasing on Blu-ray on February 22, 2022.

Reception

Critical reception
Ian Jane from Rock! Shock! Pop! found problems with the film's pacing but was praised for its plot, production values, and acting performances of the cast. Jay Cruz of Sinegang PH gave the film 3.5 out of 5 stars and describes the film as "largely melodramatic and gung ho on the surface".

Accolades

References

Notes

External links
 
 

Filipino-language films
Philippine thriller drama films
1982 films
1982 action films
Films set in the Philippines
Cine Suerte films
Films directed by Lino Brocka